The 2016 Super League season, known as the First Utility Super League XXI for sponsor reasons, was the 21st season of the Super League and 122nd season of rugby league in Britain. Twelve teams competed over 23 rounds, including the Magic Weekend which took  place at St James' Park (Newcastle upon Tyne), after which the eight highest entered the Super League play-offs for a place in the Super League Grand Final. The four lowest teams then entered the qualifying play-offs, along with the four highest teams from the Championship, to determine which teams will play again in Super League XXII.
Wigan Warriors are the current champions after successfully defeating Warrington Wolves 12–6 at Old Trafford.

Teams

Super League XXI features twelve teams, the second year in which this number has taken part. This is also the second year since promotion and relegation was reintroduced into the competition although there has been no change in teams for 2016.

Eleven teams in Super League are from the North of England: five teams, Warrington, St. Helens, Salford, Wigan and Widnes, west of the Pennines in the historic county of Lancashire and six teams, Huddersfield, Wakefield Trinity, Leeds, Castleford, Hull F.C. and Hull Kingston Rovers, to the east in Yorkshire. Catalans Dragons, in Perpignan, France, are the only team outside the North of England. St Helens, Wigan Warriors, Warrington Wolves and Leeds Rhinos as the only teams to have played in every season of Super League since 1996.

Table

 *Salford were penalized six points for a salary cap infringement during the 2014 and 2015 seasons.

Q = Qualified for Super 8s

F = Failed to qualify for the Super 8s

Super 8s

After 23 games the league table is frozen and the teams are split up into 2 of the 3 "Super 8's". Teams finishing in the top 8 go on to contest the "Super League" and will all retain a place in the competition for the next season. They will play 7 more games each, competing for a place in the Grand Final. Teams finishing in the bottom four (9-12) will be put alongside the top 4 teams from the  Championship, in "The Qualifiers" Super 8 group.

Standings

(C) = Champions

(L) = League Leaders

(Q) = Qualified for playoffs

(U) = Unable to qualify for playoffs

Play-offs

The Qualifiers

The Qualifiers sees the bottom 4 teams from Super League table join the top 4 teams from the Championship. The points totals are reset to 0 and each team plays 7 games each, playing every other team once. After 7 games each, the teams finishing 1st, 2nd, and 3rd will gain qualification to the 2017 Super League season. The teams finishing 4th and 5th will play in the "Million Pound Game" at the home of the 4th place team which will earn the winner a place in the 2017 Super League. The loser, along with teams finishing 6th, 7th and 8th, will be relegated to or remain in the Championship.

Standings

(S) = Will play in Super League in 2017

(C) = Will play in Championship in 2017

Million Pound Game

Player statistics

Top try scorers

Top goalscorers

Top try assists

Top points scorers

 Statistics correct as of 24 September 2016

Attendances

Average attendances

Top 10 attendances

 Statistics correct as of 24 July 2016

End-of-season awards
Awards are presented for outstanding contributions and efforts to players and clubs in the week leading up to the Super League Grand Final:

 Man of Steel: Danny Houghton -   Hull F.C.
 Coach of the year: Lee Radford -  Hull F.C.
 Super League club of the year:  Hull F.C.
 Young player of the year: Tom Johnstone -  Wakefield Trinity Wildcats
 Foundation of the year: 
 Rhino "Top Gun": Marc Sneyd -  Hull F.C.
 Metre-maker: Chris Hill -  Warrington Wolves
 Top Try Scorer: Denny Solomona (40) -  Castleford Tigers
 Hit Man: Danny Houghton -  Hull F.C.

Media

Television
2016 is the fifth and final year of a five-year contract with Sky Sports to televise 70 matches per season. The deal is worth £90million.

Sky Sports coverage in the UK will see two live matches broadcast each week, usually at 8:00 pm on Thursday and Friday nights.

Regular commentators will be  Eddie Hemmings and Mike Stephenson with summarisers including Phil Clarke, Brian Carney, Barrie McDermott and Terry O'Connor. Sky will broadcast highlights on Sunday nights on Super League - Full Time at 10 p.m.

BBC Sport will broadcast a highlights programme called the Super League Show, presented by Tanya Arnold. The BBC show two weekly broadcasts of the programme, the first to the BBC North West, Yorkshire, North East and Cumbria, and East Yorkshire and Lincolnshire regions on Monday evenings at 11:35 p.m. on BBC One, while a repeat showing is shown nationally on BBC Two on Tuesday afternoons at 1.30 p.m. The Super League Show is also available for one week after broadcast for streaming or download via the BBC iPlayer in the UK only. End of season play-offs are shown on BBC Two across the whole country in a weekly highlights package on Sunday afternoons.

Internationally, Super League is shown live or delayed on beIN Sports (France), Showtime Sports (Middle East), Sky Sport (New Zealand), TV 2 Sport (Norway), Fox Soccer Plus (United States), Fox Sports (Australia) and Sportsnet World (Canada).

Radio

BBC Coverage:

 BBC Radio 5 Live Sports Extra (National DAB Digital Radio) will carry two Super League commentaries each week on Thursday and Friday nights (both kick off 8pm); this will be through the 5 Live Rugby league programme which is presented by Dave Woods with a guest summariser (usually a Super League player or coach) and also includes interviews and debate..
 BBC Radio Humberside will have full match commentary of all Hull KR and Hull matches.
 BBC Radio Leeds carry commentaries featuring Leeds, Castleford, Wakefield and Huddersfield.
 BBC Radio Manchester will carry commentary of Wigan and Salford whilst sharing commentary of Warrington with BBC Radio Merseyside.
 BBC Radio Merseyside (will have commentary on St Helens and Widnes matches whilst sharing commentary of Warrington with BBC Radio Manchester.

Commercial Radio Coverage:

 102.4 Wish FM will carry commentaries of Wigan & St Helens matches.
 107.2 Wire FM will carry commentaries on Warrington Home and Away.
 Radio Yorkshire will launch in March carrying Super League commentaries. 
 Radio Warrington (Online Station) all Warrington home games and some away games.
 Grand Sud FM covers every Catalans Dragons Home Match (in French).
 Radio France Bleu Roussillon covers every Catalans Dragons Away Match (in French).
 Talksport and Talksport 2 will carry weekly live matches throughout the UK, plus phone-in programs and a weekly magazine show hosted by Robbie Hunter-Paul.

All Super League commentaries on any station are available via the particular stations on-line streaming.

References

External links
Official Site
BBC Rugby League